The Benton County State Bank Building, also known as The Madison Building, located in Corvallis, Oregon, is listed on the National Register of Historic Places.

It was built in 1907.

See also
 National Register of Historic Places listings in Benton County, Oregon

References

1907 establishments in Oregon
Bank buildings on the National Register of Historic Places in Oregon
Buildings and structures in Corvallis, Oregon
Commercial buildings completed in 1907
National Register of Historic Places in Benton County, Oregon